Lanzaro is a surname. Notable people with the surname include:

Maurizio Lanzaro (born 1982), Italian footballer and coach
William M. Lanzaro, American politician